Edward George Skrein (born 29 March 1983) is a British actor, film director, screenwriter and rapper. He gained experience as an actor in independent films or television series. In the years that followed, he became known for portraying Daario Naharis in the third season of the television series Game of Thrones. Skrein later rose to greater recognition portraying the villain Francis Freeman/Ajax in the superhero-comedy film Deadpool (2016). Skrein went on to replace Jason Statham in the action film The Transporter: Refueled (2015) and portrayed the cocky bounty-hunting cyborg Zapan in Alita: Battle Angel (2019). He later starred as Lt. Dick Best in the war film Midway (2019). 

Skrein made his directorial debut with the short film Little River Run (2020), which he released on his Instagram.

Early life 
Skrein was born in Camden, London, England, and was raised there and in other London boroughs, Haringey and Islington. He is of English and Austrian Jewish descent. Skrein attended Fortismere School. He graduated from Byam Shaw School of Art, a public tertiary art school, with a BA Hons degree in fine art painting.

Career

Music
In 2004, Skrein released a three track EP under the record label Dented Records. In 2007, he released his first album, The Eat Up. He has collaborated with a variety of artists including Foreign Beggars, Asian Dub Foundation, Plan B, Dubbledge and Doc Brown. Later that year, Skrein released a collaborative EP, Pre-Emptive Nostalgia, with the group A State of Mind. In 2009 Skrein collaborated with rapper Dr Syntax to bring the collaborative album Scene Stealers under the name Skreintax.

Acting
Skrein made his acting debut in Plan B's short film Michelle. Skrein got his first lead role in Plan B's Ill Manors. Skrein portrayed Daario Naharis in the third season of the television series Game of Thrones. However, in the fourth season of the series, he was replaced by Dutch actor Michiel Huisman.  Skrein states that it was not his choice to leave the show. In 2014, Skrein was cast in The Transporter: Refueled, replacing Jason Statham as the lead. Though the film was critically panned, his performance was praised. In 2016, Skrein played the lead villain, Ajax, in the blockbuster action film Deadpool. In 2017 Skrein also appeared in the music video for 'Eye Contact' by Ocean Wisdom playing the bad guy.

In 2018, Skrein starred in psychological revenge thriller, In Darkness, alongside Natalie Dormer and Stacy Martin; principal photography began in early 2016. He was slated to star in the Hellboy reboot as Ben Daimio, a Japanese-American character; after controversy over his casting, Skrein announced on Twitter that he was stepping down from the role in the hopes an actor of the proper ethnicity would be cast.

On 8 November 2019, he starred in Roland Emmerich’s blockbuster movie  Midway, co-starring Mandy Moore, Patrick Wilson, Luke Evans, Aaron Eckhart, Nick Jonas, Dennis Quaid and Woody Harrelson.

In 2022, Skrein starred as Vince in I Used to Be Famous. Leslie Felperin, writing for The Guardian, gave the film 3/5 stars, calling it a "sweet-natured but predictable comedy drama".

Writing and directing 
Skrein made his directing debut by directing and writing the short drama film Little River Run which he released on 20 July 2020 at his Instagram.

Personal life
Since he was 12 years old, Skrein has been a swimming coach for Greenwich Leisure Limited working at leisure centres such as Caledonian Road Pool and Gym and Archway Pool.

Discography

Studio albums

Extended plays

Filmography

Film

Television

References

External links
 Ed Skrein at the British Film Institute
 

English hip hop musicians
English male film actors
English male rappers
English male television actors
English people of Austrian-Jewish descent
Grime music artists
Living people
Male actors from London
Rappers from London
21st-century English male actors
1983 births